Charles François Siméon de Rouvroy, called Monseigneur de Saint-Simon (executed 1794) was a French bishop. He was the last bishop of Agde.

Family 
He was the son of Louis de Rouvroy, marquis de Sandricourt and was the uncle of Claude Henri de Rouvroy, comte de Saint-Simon. 
He belonged to a minor branch of the Dukes of Saint-Simon.

Career 
After his ordination 1759 by his nephew mgr. Claude - Charles de Rouvroy, he became member of the 'Académie royale des Inscriptions et Belles-Lettres. He was a fond collector of books and spent nights in his library, suffering from asthma.

During the French Revolution the bishop was arrested and executed by Guillotine.

References 

Charles Francois